Alain Lefebvre, born 1 April 1947, is a French journalist.

Biography 

Former activist of the Fédération des étudiants nationalistes (Federation of Nationalist Students), Lefebvre also contributed to Cahiers universitaires, the movement's newspaper. In 1968, he became one of the founders of the Groupement de recherche et d'études pour la civilisation européenne (GRECE). After that, he joined the Le Figaro Magazine (Figaro diary) with Alain de Benoist and other "neo-rightists". He founded the ephemeral Magazine hebdo while managing the groupe Media and L'Histoire magazine.

Lefebvre is also interested in advertising in collaboration with journalist Christian Blachas, also host of the show Culture-Pub.

References 

1947 births
Living people
New Right (Europe)